Fitzroy or FitzRoy may refer to:

People

As a given name
Several members of the Somerset family (Dukes of Beaufort) have this as a middle-name:
FitzRoy Somerset, 1st Baron Raglan (1788–1855)
Henry Charles FitzRoy Somerset, 8th Duke of Beaufort (1824–1899)
Henry Adelbert Wellington FitzRoy Somerset, 9th Duke of Beaufort (1847–1924)
Henry Hugh Arthur FitzRoy Somerset, 10th Duke of Beaufort (1900–1984)
Henry FitzRoy Somerset, 12th Duke of Beaufort (born 1952), called Bunter Worcester
Fitzroy Alexander (1926–1988), better known as Lord Melody, a calypsonian from Trinidad
Sir Fitzroy Maclean (1911-1996), Scottish soldier, writer and politician

As a surname
 Fitzroy (surname), i.e. not the form FitzRoy

Descendants of Charles II and Barbara Palmer
 Anne Lennard, Countess of Sussex or Lady Anne Fitzroy (1661–1722), daughter of King Charles II of England and Barbara Palmer, 1st Duchess of Cleveland
 Charles FitzRoy, 2nd Duke of Cleveland (1662–1730), son of Charles II and Barbara Palmer
 William FitzRoy, 3rd Duke of Cleveland (1698–1774), his son and last of the Cleveland-Southampton line
 Henry FitzRoy, 1st Duke of Grafton (1663–1690), son of Charles II and Barbara Palmer
 and the Dukes of Grafton and their families, including:
 Charles FitzRoy, 2nd Duke of Grafton (1683–1757), Irish and English politician
 Augustus FitzRoy, 3rd Duke of Grafton (1735–1811), British Prime Minister
 Charles FitzRoy, 1st Baron Southampton (1737–1797), a grandson of the 2nd Duke
 and the Barons Southampton and their families, including:
 Charles Augustus FitzRoy (1796–1858), British military officer and Governor of New South Wales, grandson of the 3rd Duke
 Robert FitzRoy (1805–1865), British naval officer, captain of HMS Beagle, meteorologist, surveyor, hydrographer, and Governor of New Zealand, another grandson of the 3rd Duke
 George FitzRoy, 1st Duke of Northumberland (1665–1716), son of Charles II and Barbara Palmer
 Lady Barbara FitzRoy (1672–1731), youngest daughter of Charles II and Barbara Palmer

Others
 Adam FitzRoy (died 1322), illegitimate son of Edward II of England
 Henry FitzRoy, 1st Duke of Richmond and Somerset (1519–1536), son of Henry VIII of England and Elizabeth Blount.
 Matilda FitzRoy, Duchess of Brittany, illegitimate daughter of Henry I of England and an unnamed mistress.
 Matilda FitzRoy, Countess of Perche (died 1120), illegitimate daughter of Henry I of England and Edith.
 Matilda FitzRoy, Abbess of Montivilliers (c. 1102 – c. 1172), daughter of Henry I of England and an unknown mistress.
 Philip of Cognac or Philip FitzRoy (died 1220), illegitimate son of Richard I of England.
 Richard FitzRoy (c. 1190 – 1246), son of John Lackland, King of England.

Fictional characters
 Trevor Fitzroy, a Marvel Comics and X-Men villain
 Daisy Fitzroy, a character in Bioshock series
 Fitzroy Vacker, a character from the Keeper of the Lost Cities book series.
 Walter Fitzroy, better known as Fuse, a playable character in the game Apex Legends

Places

Argentina
 Monte Fitz Roy, also known as Cerro Chaltén
 Fitz Roy, Santa Cruz, a town and municipality in southern Argentina

Australia
 Fitzroy Crossing, a town in Western Australia
 Fitzroy, Victoria, a suburb of Melbourne
 Fitzroy, South Australia, a suburb of Adelaide
 Electoral district of Fitzroy (Queensland), an abolished state electorate in Queensland
 Electoral district of Fitzroy (Victoria), an abolished state electorate in Victoria
 Fitzroy County, a cadastral division of New South Wales
 Fitzroy Island National Park, Queensland
 Fitzroy Islands (Tasmania)
 Fitzroy North, Victoria
 Fitzroy River (Queensland)
 Fitzroy River (Western Australia)

Canada
 Fitzroy Harbour, Ontario
 Fitzroy Provincial Park

Chile
 Fitzroy Channel, near Punta Arenas

Falkland Islands
 Fitzroy, Falkland Islands

New Zealand
 Fitzroy, Taranaki, a suburb of New Plymouth
 Fitzroy, Waikato, a suburb of Hamilton
 Port Fitzroy, Great Barrier Island

Patagonia
 Fitz Roy, a mountain

United Kingdom
 Fitzroy Square, in London
 FitzRoy, a sea area in the BBC Shipping Forecast

United States
 Admiral Fitzroy Inn, Newport, RI, USA
 The Fitzroy, apartment building in New York City

Ships
 , more than one British ship of the Royal Navy

Sport
 Fitzroy Bulldogs, a proposed Australian rules football club in Victoria, Australia
 Fitzroy City SC, an association football club in Victoria, Australia
 Fitzroy District FC, an association football club in Victoria, Australia
 Fitzroy Football Club, an Australian rules football club in Victoria, Australia
 Fitzroy Football Club (South Australia), an Australian rules football club in South Australia
 Fitzroy SC (1966–1973), a defunct Association football (soccer) club in, Victoria, Australia
 Fitzroy Stars Football Club, an Australian rules football club in Victoria, Australia
 Heidelberg United FC, formerly Fitzroy United Alexander FC, an association football club in Victoria, Australia
 North Fitzroy Kangaroos, a proposed Australian rules football club in Victoria, Australia

See also
 Fitzroya, a genus of tree

Norman-language surnames
Surnames of English origin